The 2019 Africa U-20 Cup of Nations qualification was a men's under-20 football competition which decided the participating teams of the 2019 Africa U-20 Cup of Nations.

Players born 1 January 1999 or later are eligible to participate in the competition. A total of eight teams qualified to play in the final tournament, including Niger who qualified automatically as hosts.

Teams
Apart from Niger, the remaining 53 members of CAF were eligible to enter the qualifying competition, and a total of 40 national teams were in the qualifying draw, which was announced on 26 February 2018.

Notes
Teams in bold qualified for the final tournament.

Did not enter

Format
Qualification ties are played on a home-and-away two-legged basis. If the aggregate score is tied after the second leg, the away goals rule is applied, and if still tied, the penalty shoot-out (no extra time) is used to determine the winner.

Schedule
The schedule of the qualifying rounds is as follows.

Bracket
The bracket of the draw was announced by the CAF on 26 February 2018.

The seven winners of the third round qualify for the final tournament.

First round

|}

Mauritania won 2–1 on aggregate.

Guinea-Bissau won 1–0 on aggregate.

Algeria won 5–2 on aggregate.

Benin won on walkover after Liberia withdrew.

Gabon won 5–2 on aggregate.

1–1 on aggregate. Rwanda won on away goals.

Burundi won 3–0 on aggregate.

Uganda won 8–1 on aggregate.

0–0 on aggregate. Tanzania won 6–5 on penalties.

Mozambique won 6–0 on aggregate.

1–1 on aggregate. Malawi won on away goals.

1–1 on aggregate. Botswana won on away goals.

Second round

|}

3–3 on aggregate. Mauritania won on away goals.

Nigeria won 3–2 on aggregate.

Ghana won 2–0 on aggregate.

Benin won 3–2 on aggregate.

Burkina Faso won 6–4 on aggregate.

Gabon won 3–2 on aggregate.

Zambia won 3–1 on aggregate.

Burundi won 3–1 on aggregate.

1–1 on aggregate. Cameroon won 5–4 on penalties.

Mali won 6–2 on aggregate.

South Africa won 4–1 on aggregate.

Malawi won 5–3 on aggregate.

Congo won 4–1 on aggregate.

0–0 on aggregate. Senegal won 7–6 on penalties.

Third round
Winners qualify for 2019 Africa U-20 Cup of Nations.

|}

Nigeria won 6–1 on aggregate.

Ghana won 4–2 on aggregate.

Burkina Faso won 4–1 on aggregate.

Burundi won 3–1 on aggregate.

Mali won 4–1 on aggregate.

South Africa won 2–0 on aggregate.

Senegal won 6–3 on aggregate.

Qualified teams
The following eight teams qualify for the final tournament.

1 Bold indicates champions for that year. Italic indicates hosts for that year.

Goalscorers
4 goals

 Abdoul Tapsoba
 Eric Bekale Biyoghe
 Steven Mukwala

3 goals

 Bienvenue Shaka
 Racine Louamba
 Gabriel Ndong
 Wasiu Alalade

2 goals

 Samson Akinyoola
 Thabang Khuduga
 Salifou Diarrassouba
 Djuma Muhamedi
 Alain Miyogho
 Richard Danso
 Sékou Camara
 Mada Pereira
 Elmahdi Elkout
 Jihad Shaldun
 Peter Banda
 Hadji Dramé
 Diadié Samnadjaré
 El Bilal Touré
 Cheikh Ahmed Kamara
 Kamo-Kamo
 Francisco Pestana
 Nazifi Yahaya
 Youssouph Badji
 Lyle Foster
 Yosri Hamza
 Allan Okello
 Francisco Mwepu

1 goal

 Zineddine Belaïd
 Redouane Zerdoum
 Merouane Zerrouki
 Adem Zorgane
 Aisson
 Gelson
 Vanilson
 Odo Chabi
 Ibrahim Ogoulola
 Allagbani Saliou
 Kouamé Botué
 Kalifa Nikiema
 Djibril Ouattara
 Abdoul Abbase Ripama
 Bienvenue Kanakimana
 Titi Mavugo
 Moussa Muryango
 Pascal Ramazani
 Taddeus Nkeng
 Moïse Sakava
 Prestige Mboungou
 Roland Okouri
 Borel Tomandzoto
 Ebrima Colley
 Adama Jammeh
 Prosper Ahiabu
 Ibrahim Sadiq
 Ishaku Konda
 Mohammed Kudus
 Aguibou Camara
 João Ricciulli
 Wilfried Singo
 Richard Odada
 Kelvin Kadzinje
 Auspicious Kadzongola
 Chinsinsi Maonga
 Chikondi Mbeta
 Mohamed Camara
 Ousmane Diakité
 Mamadou Samaké
 Mamadou Traoré
 Abdou El Id
 Mohamed Salem
 El Hassen Teguedi
 Fody Traoré
 Driss Khalid
 Rui Antonio Gimo
 Jochua Nhantumbo
 Obasi Rosebette
 Bethuel Muzeu
 Aremu Afeez
 Adamu Alhassan
 Abubakar Ibrahim
 Aniekeme Okon
 Rague Byiringiro
 Gueulette Marie
 Ousseynou Diagné
 Dion Lopy
 Ousseynou Niang
 Amadou Sagna
 Kobamelo Kodisang
 Tashreeq Matthews
 Wiseman Meyiwa
 Thabiso Monyane
 Walaa Eldin Yaqoub
 Leon Manyisa
 Paul Peter Kasunda
 Habibu Kiyombo
 Bilal Akoro
 Komla Yannick
 Mustafa Kizza
 Sadam Masereka
 Hamisi Tibita
 Lameck Banda
 Mwiya Malumo

1 own goal

 Alford Velaphi (against Congo)
 Kelly Kombila (against Ivory Coast)
 Sanad Khemissi (against Algeria)
 Musitafa Mujuzi (against South Sudan)

Notes

References

External links
21st Edition TOTAL U-20 Africa Cup Of Nations, Niger 2019, CAFonline.com

U-20 Cup of Nations qualification
Africa U-20 Cup of Nations qualification
Qualification
2019
March 2018 sports events in Africa
April 2018 sports events in Africa
May 2018 sports events in Africa
July 2018 sports events in Africa
August 2018 sports events in Africa